The Eurovision Song Contest 1995 was the 40th edition of the Eurovision Song Contest, held on 13 May 1995 at the Point Theatre in Dublin, Ireland. It was the third consecutive contest to be held in Ireland, and the second consecutive edition to be held in the Point Theatre in Dublin.

Location

Ireland thus became the first, and  only country to have hosted three successive contests.

The selected venue was the Point Theatre, a concert and events venue located amongst the Dublin Docklands which had originally been built as a train depot to serve the nearby port. Opened as a music venue in 1988, it was closed for redevelopment and expansion in 2008 and is now known as the 3Arena. Having previously hosted the 1994 contest, Dublin became the first city to host two consecutive Eurovision Song Contests, with the Point Theatre also serving as the host venue for the second year in a row. 

Alternative venues in Galway and Limerick were considered by RTÉ, however Dublin was chosen to stage the contest again as it was judged to have been the more cost-effective location. A proposal by the British broadcaster BBC to host the contest, either by themselves or as a joint production hosted in Belfast, the capital city of Northern Ireland, were also rejected by RTÉ as the Irish broadcaster chose to produce the contest on its own. RTÉ however did request a rule change, which was accepted by the EBU, which would have relieved them of the responsibility of producing the contest again should Ireland produce a fourth consecutive winner.

Production and format
The Eurovision Song Contest 1995 was produced by the Irish public broadcaster  (RTÉ). John McHugh served as executive producer, John Comiskey served as director, Alan Farquharson served as designers, and Noel Kelehan served as musical director, leading the RTÉ Concert Orchestra. The show was presented by journalist and television presenter Mary Kennedy. RTÉ was reported to have spent IR£2.3 million on staging the contest, with the Northern Ireland Tourist Board and the National Lottery among the contest's sponsors. Through the partnership with the National Lottery, around 1,000 places in the audience were filled by members of the public who had won tickets by playing scratchcards. 

Each participating broadcaster submitted one song, which was required to be no longer than three minutes in duration and performed in the language, or one of the languages, of the country which it represented. A maximum of six performers were allowed on stage during each country's performance, and all participants were required to have reached the age of 16 in the year of the contest. Each entry could utilise all or part of the live orchestra and could use instrumental-only backing tracks, however any backing tracks used could only include the sound of instruments featured on stage being mimed by the performers.

The results of the 1995 contest were determined through the same scoring system as had first been introduced in : each country awarded twelve points to its favourite entry, followed by ten points to its second favourite, and then awarded points in decreasing value from eight to one for the remaining songs which featured in the country's top ten, with countries unable to vote for their own entry. The points awarded by each country were determined by an assembled jury of sixteen individuals, which was required to be split evenly between members of the public and music professionals, between men and women, and between those over and under 30 years of age. Each jury member voted in secret and awarded between one and ten votes to each participating song, excluding that from their own country and with no abstentions permitted. The votes of each member were collected following the country's performance and then tallied by the non-voting jury chairperson to determine the points to be awarded. In any cases where two or more songs in the top ten received the same number of votes, a show of hands by all jury members was used to determine the final placing.

Rehearsals in the contest venue for the competing acts began on 8 May 1995. Each country had two technical rehearsals in the week approaching the contest, with countries rehearsing in the order in which they would perform. The first rehearsals took place on 8 and 9 May, with each country allowed 40 minutes total on stage, with an opportunity to review recordings with producers and to consult on suggested changes afterwards, followed by a 20 minute press conference. Each country's second rehearsals took place on 10 and 11 May, with 30 minutes total on stage. Three dress rehearsals were held with all artists, two held in the afternoon and evening of 12 May and one final rehearsals in the afternoon of 13 May. An audience was present for the second dress rehearsal in the evening of 12 May, with this rehearsal also recorded for use as a production stand-by in case of problems during the live contest. The competing delegations were additionally invited to a welcome reception during the week in the build-up to the event, organised by Irish Ferries and hosted at the Royal Hospital Kilmainham on the evening of 8 May.

To celebrate the contest's fortieth anniversary, the show opened with a four-minute sequence, directed by Pat Cowap, containing clips and performances from previous contests; Cowap had previously served as director of the 1994 contest. The contest's interval act, entitled "", was an original piece composed by Mícheál Ó Súilleabháin and which combined Gregorian chant and sean-nós singing with contemporary music. Among the performers of "" were Súilleabháin on piano, Scottish percussionist Evelyn Glennie, Irish singers Brian Kennedy and Nóirín Ní Riain, members of the Irish folk band Clannad, the Benedictine monks of Glenstal Abbey, and the RTÉ Concert Orchestra conducted by Proinnsías Ó Duinn. The trophy awarded to the winners was designed by Kevin O'Dwyer, and was presented by the previous year's winning artists Paul Harrington and Charlie McGettigan.

Participating countries
Twenty-three countries were permitted to participate in the contest, which was to comprise the sixteen highest-scoring countries in the 1994 contest and returning countries that had been relegated and prevented from participating in the previous year's event. The total line-up was reduced from the twenty-five countries which participated in the 1994 contest to ensure that the event would not last longer than three hours. Switzerland did not participate in the contest for the first time, leaving  as the sole country to have participated in every edition of the contest to that point.

Following the confirmation of the twenty-three competing countries, the draw to determine the running order was held on 9 December 1994.

Conductors
A separate musical director could be nominated by each country to lead the orchestra during their performance, with the host musical director, Noel Kelehan, also available to conduct for those countries which did not nominate their own conductor. The conductors listed below led the orchestra during the performance for the indicated countries.

 Noel Kelehan
 Noel Kelehan
 
 Sinan Alimanović
 Geir Langslet
 
 Frank McNamara
 Michael F. Kienzl
 Eduardo Leiva
 Melih Kibar
 
 Michel Bernholc
 Miklós Malek
 
 Mike Dixon
 
 George Theofanous
 Anders Berglund
 Frede Ewert
 Jože Privšek
 Gadi Goldman
 Ray Agius
 Haris Andreadis

Participants and results 

The contest took place on 13 May 1995 at 20:00 (IST) and lasted 2 hours and 51 minutes. The table below outlines the participating countries, the order in which they performed, the competing artists and songs, and the results of the voting.

The contest featured two representatives who had previously performed in the contest.

The winner was  represented by the song "", composed by Rolf Løvland, written by Petter Skavlan and performed by Secret Garden. For their performance during the contest they were joined by instrumentalists Hans Fredrik Jacobsen and Åsa Jinder and singer . "" was a largely instrumental piece featuring only 24 words in total, with brief vocals only at the start and end of the song performed by Tvinnereim.

Spain achieved its best result since  by finishing as the contest's runner-up,  and  gained their highest placements to date by finishing in sixth and seventh place respectively, while conversely Germany finished in last place for the fourth time.

Detailed voting results 

Jury voting was used to determine the points awarded by all countries. The announcement of the results from each country was conducted in the order in which they performed, with the spokespersons announcing their country's points in English or French in ascending order. The detailed breakdown of the points awarded by each country is listed in the tables below.

12 points 
The below table summarises how the maximum 12 points were awarded from one country to another. The winning country is shown in bold.

Spokespersons 
Each country nominated a spokesperson who was responsible for announcing, in English or French, the votes for their respective country. Spokespersons at the 1995 contest are listed below.

 Jan Chojnacki
 Eileen Dunne
 Carmen Nebel
 Diana Grković-Foretić
 
 Marina Danielian
 Áslaug Dóra Eyjólfsdóttir
 
 Belén Fernández de Henestrosa
 Ömer Önder
 
 Thierry Beccaro
 Katalin Bogyay
 Marie-Françoise Renson
 Colin Berry
 Serenella Andrade
 Andreas Iakovidis
 Björn Hedman
 
 Miša Molk
 Daniel Pe'er
 Stephanie Farrugia
 Fotini Giannoulatou

Broadcasts 

Each participating broadcaster was required to relay the contest via its networks. Non-participating EBU member broadcasters were also able to relay the contest as "passive participants". Broadcasters were able to send commentators to provide coverage of the contest in their own native language and to relay information about the artists and songs to their television viewers. Known details on the broadcasts in each country, including the specific broadcasting stations and commentators are shown in the tables below.

Notes and references

Notes

References

Bibliography

External links

 

 
1995
1995 in music
1995 in Irish music
May 1995 events in Europe
1995 in Ireland
1990s in Dublin (city)
1995 in Irish television
Events in Dublin (city)
Music in Dublin (city)
Music festivals in Ireland